Chile: When Will It End? is a 1986 Australian documentary film produced by David Bradbury. The film portrays the dictatorship of General Augusto Pinochet. It was nominated for an Academy Award for Best Documentary Feature.

References

External links

Chile: Hasta Cuando? at Frontline Films

1986 films
1986 documentary films
1980s Spanish-language films
Australian documentary films
Films shot in Chile
Documentary films about Latin American military dictatorships
Augusto Pinochet
Films set in Chile